The Protram 205 WrAs is a Polish partial low-floor, articulated tram produced by the company Protram.

Utilization

The trams of this type are currently used in Wrocław Poland (thus the "Wr" in the name). The first tram of this type was delivered to MPK Wrocław in December 2006. Currently there are 22 205 WrAs trams in operation.

Tram vehicles of Poland